Mike Glanton (born June 21, 1957) is an American politician who served in the Georgia House of Representatives from the 75th district from 2013 to 2023. He previously served in the Georgia House of Representatives from the 76th district from 2007 to 2011.

Glanton resigned on January24, 2023 due to health reasons, saying, "People deserve an active leader, and right now I don't think I could be"; a special election will be held on March 21, 2023 to fill the seat.

References

1960 births
Living people
21st-century American politicians